Crush may refer to:

Film
 Crush (1972 film), a Hong Kong film
 Crush (1992 film), a New Zealand film by Alison Maclean
 The Crush (1993 film), a film by Alan Shapiro, starring Cary Elwes and Alicia Silverstone
 Crush (2001 film), a film John McKay, starring Andie MacDowell
 Crush (2009 film), a film by John V. Soto, starring Christopher Egan
 Crush (2009 Russian film), a Russian film
 The Crush (2010 film), a short film by Michael Creagh
 Crush (2013 film), an American film by Malik Bader, starring Crystal Reed
 Crush (2014 film), an Indonesian film
 Crush (2022 film), an American film by Sammi Cohen, starring Rowan Blanchard
 Crush, a green sea turtle character in the Finding Nemo franchise

Food and drugs
 Crush (soft drink), a soft drink brand
 Camel Crush, a brand of cigarettes
 Crush or crushing, the initial step of winemaking

Music

Artists
 Crush (rock band), a 1990–1993 American/English alternative rock band
 Crush (British group), a 1990s pop duo featuring Jayni Hoy and Donna Air from Byker Grove
 Crush (Canadian band), a 2000–2006 band
 Crush (singer) (born 1992), South Korean R&B and hip-hop singer

Albums
 Crush (2NE1 album) or the title song, 2014
 Crush (Abe Vigoda album) or the title song, 2010
 Crush (Bon Jovi album), 2000
 Crush (Doughboys album), 1993
 Crush (Floating Points album), 2019
 Crush (Orchestral Manoeuvres in the Dark album) or the title song, 1985
 Crush (EP), by Ravyn Lenae, 2018
 Crush, by IQ, 2008
 Crush, by Lettuce, 2015
 The Crush, by Anomie Belle, 2011
 Crushes (The Covers Mixtape), by Mates of State, 2010
 Crushin', by the Fat Boys, or the title song, 1987
 Crushing (album), by Julia Jacklin, 2019

Songs
 "Crush" (Dave Matthews Band song), 1998
 "Crush" (David Archuleta song), 2008
 "Crush" (Fugative song), 2010
 "Crush" (Grace Jones song), 1987
 "Crush" (I.O.I song), 2016
 "Crush" (Jennifer Paige song), 1998
 "Crush" (Mandy Moore song), 2001
 "Crush" (Paul van Dyk song), 2004
 "Crush" (Pendulum song), 2011
 "Crush" (Yuna song), 2016
 "Crush (1980 Me)", by Darren Hayes, 2003
 "C.R.U.S.H.", by Ciara from Ciara: The Evolution, 2006
 "Crush", by 16volt from LetDownCrush, 1996
 "Crush", by Amerie from Because I Love It, 2007
 "Crush", by Anthrax from Volume 8: The Threat Is Real, 1998
 "Crush", by Avril Lavigne from Head Above Water, 2019
 "Crush", by Carys from To Anyone Like Me, 2020
 "Crush", by Frank Klepacki from the Command & Conquer: Red Alert video game soundtrack, 1996
 "Crush", by Frankie J, 2009
 "Crush", by Jimmy Eat World from Clarity, 1999
 "Crush", by Lila McCann from Something in the Air, 1999
 "Crush", by Mario Judah, 2020
 "Crush", by MCND, 2021
 "Crush", by Selena Gomez & the Scene from Kiss & Tell, 2009
 "Crush", by Sleigh Bells from Reign of Terror, 2012
 "Crush", by the Smashing Pumpkins from Gish, 1991
 "Crush", by Solange Knowles from Solo Star, 2002
 "Crush", by Stereophonics from Pull the Pin, 2007
 "Crush", by Tall Dwarfs from Slugbucket Hairybreath Monster, 1984
 "Crush", by Tessa Violet from Bad Ideas, 2019
 "Crush", by Weki Meki from Kiss, Kicks, 2019
 "Crush", by Zhane from Saturday Night, 1997
 "The Crush", by Parokya ni Edgar from Khangkhungkherrnitz, 1996

Companies
 Crush Management

Television
 Crush (U.S. game show), a game show hosted by Andrew Krasny
 "Crush" (Buffy the Vampire Slayer), a 2001 episode of Buffy the Vampire Slayer
 "Crush" (Haven), an episode of Haven
 "Crush", an episode of Heartstopper
 "Crush", an episode of Kim Possible
 "Crush", an episode of the Law & Order: Special Victims Unit
 "Crush", an episode of Smallville
 Crush, gladiator on the American Gladiators series

People
 Crush (singer), singer from South Korea
 Brian Adams (wrestler) or Crush (1964–2007), American professional wrestler
 Gina Carano or Crush (born 1982), American mixed martial arts fighter

Sports
 Colorado Crush, an American football team
 CRUSH, a women's professional wrestling organization

Technology
 Criminal Reduction Utilising Statistical History or CRUSH, an IBM predictive analytics system
 Cattle crush, a standing stock or cage for restraining livestock
 Crush, an engineering term for preload that deforms a part
 Crush, the codename for NVIDIA's nForce chipset for the Athlon processor
 Crush or crushing, destructive compression as by a crusher
 Crush, one of the former names for the American social media app Gas.

Other uses
 Crush (comics), a 2003 series of comics
 Crushing (execution), a torturous method of execution
 Infatuation or limerence, the romantic attraction to another person
 Puppy love, feelings of love, romance, or infatuation felt by young people
 Crush (video game), a 2007 video game
 Crush, Texas, a temporary "city" established as a one-day publicity stunt in 1896
 Crush injury, an injury by an object that causes compression of the body
 Crush syndrome, major shock and kidney failure after a crushing injury
 Crush fetish, a fetish in which sexual arousal is associated with observing objects being crushed or being crushed oneself
Crush, a collection of poetry by Richard Siken
 Crowd crush, large group of people pressed together
 Crush, a character in the series Rusty Rivets

See also
 Crush 40, a Japanese-American band featured in the Sonic the Hedgehog video game franchise
 "crushcrushcrush", a 2007 song by Paramore
 Crushed (disambiguation)
 Crushed black, where shadow detail is lost and rendered as black areas
 Crusher (disambiguation)
 Krush (disambiguation)
 Love (disambiguation)